"Teach Me How to Dougie" is a song recorded by American hip hop group Cali Swag District. It was produced by Runway Star for Cali Swag District's debut studio album, The Kickback (2011). The song was written by Chanti Glee, Charon Childs, and Corey Fowler, and was released digitally on April 12, 2010 as the first single from the album through Capitol Records. The title refers to the Dougie dance, which originated in Dallas, Texas by rapper, Lil' Wil from his song "My Dougie".

"Teach Me How to Dougie" was a commercial success, and peaked at number 28 on the Billboard Hot 100, peaked at number 9 on the Hot R&B/Hip-Hop Songs, and peaked at number 6 on the Hot Rap Songs. It was certified platinum in the United States.

The song's accompanying music video was directed by Yolande Geralds, and features Cali Swag and others partying, dancing and skateboarding.

Composition 
The song features a metronomic and "cowbell-bolstered" beat. Cali Swag District trades their verses "tag-team" style, bragging about the "Dougie" dance and the "special treatment it earns them from women." Jon Caramanica of The New York Times states that JayAre "stakes out dissenter ground", and quotes the lyric: "Back of the party, I don't really like to boogie / I'm just trying to get bent and meet a thick redbone."

Critical reception 
Melanie Bertoldi of Billboard said the track seeks to pick up where "You're a Jerk" and "Crank That" left off, and commented while the dance might leave something to be desired, that the track's "catchy, refreshingly simple hook makes it a no-brainer for repeat play." Jon Caramanica of The New York Times praised the song, especially JayAre's verse, calling him "kinetic", and said he flows "hard on all angles."

Music video 
The music video was directed by Yolande Geralds, and was filmed in the group's hometown of Inglewood, California. Aside from showcasing Inglewood's diversity, video features cameos from B-Hamp, New Boyz, and Teyana Taylor, as well as the members of Cali Swag District dancing, partying and skateboarding in the town. It also includes dancing shots of "bubba", a person referenced in the song because of his ability to do the Dougie. C-Smoove stated:
We enjoyed it because everybody came through. It was like our whole city came, so we pretty much knew everybody and if we didn't, we got to meet them. It was all around fun, because we didn't expect that many people to turn out, even though that's what we were looking for. We hoped for the best, but ... it turned out better than we expected. It was just a good look. 
Chris Ryan of MTV Buzzworthy complimented the dance and video, comparing it to Hurricane Chris's "Halle Berry" and Digital Underground's "The Humpty Dance", stating, "Finally, a dance movement that we can actually see ourselves participating in. It's simple, slow and looks fun enough."

Live performances 
After releasing "Teach Me How to Dougie" in the spring of 2010, Cali Swag District was invited to perform the single on a number of television programs and at various concert settings. They first performed the single at the 2010 102 JAMZ SuperJam at Greensboro Coliseum in Greensboro, North Carolina on May 21, 2010. The group performed the single at the 2010 BET Awards pre-show by 106 and Park which aired live on the network June 27, 2010. On June 30, 2010, they performed at Skeetox, hosted by DJ Skee, at The Roxy in West Hollywood, California. They performed on Fuel TV network's The Daily Habit on July 2, 2010. On July 21, 2010, Cali Swag District performed the hit song at the Entertainer's Basketball Classic at Rucker Park in Harlem, New York City, New York. During the event, the group members also served as judges during a "Teach Me How to Dougie" competition. Cali Swag District performed "Teach Me How to Dougie" live at the Foxy Summer Jam at Crown Coliseum in Fayetteville, North Carolina on July 24, 2010. Again, Cali Swag District performed at the University of California, Irvine, for their annual Shocktoberfest on October 15, 2010. 
Finally, they helped kick off the 2011 NBA All-Star Weekend on February 18, performing at the Staples Center in Los Angeles, California, which was aired live on TNT.

Track listing

Remix 
 "Teach Me How to Dougie (Remix)" [feat. Jermaine Dupri, B.O.B, Bow Wow & Red Café]
 "Teach Me How to Dougie (Remix)" [feat. Sean Kingston & B.o.B]
 "Teach Me how To Dougie (Remix)" [feat. Tyga]
 "Teach Me How To Dougie (Remix)" [feat. Terravita]
 "Teach Me How To Dougie (Remix)" [feat. Pharrell Williams, Future, Oluniké Adeliyi & Yewande Adekoya]

Charts and certifications

Weekly charts

Year-end charts

Certifications

References

2010 debut singles
2010 songs
Cali Swag District songs
Capitol Records singles
Novelty and fad dances
Future (rapper) songs
Songs about dancing
2010 singles
Hip hop dance